Atta Kusi (born 12 October 1992) is a Ghanaian professional footballer who plays as a right-back for Ghanaian Premier League side King Faisal Babes. He previously played for side Ashanti Gold, Kumasi Asante Kotoko and Liberty Professionals.

Career

Liberty Professionals 
Kusi started his career with Liberty Professionals, before moving to Amidaus Professionals and back to Liberty.

Asante Kotoko 
In January 2015, he joined Asante Kotoko as a free agent on a 3-year deal. He was seen as the replacement for Rahim Ayew whose contract with the club had expired. He made his debut on 30 January 2015, coming on in the 24th minute after Christopher Bonney received a knock and had to be substituted. He helped the club to secure a 1–0 victory and keep a clean sheet. He parted ways with the club in 2017.

Ashanti Gold 
After staying without a club for two years, in July 2019, he was signed on a two-year contract by Obuasi-based club Ashanti Gold. He was a member of the Ashanti Gold squad that played in the 2020–21 CAF Confederation Cup.

King Faisal 
In March 2021, Kusi joined King Faisal Babes as a free agent on a short-term deal till the end of the season. With the club's 16th position on the league table, he was a brought in with the likes of Eric Donkor and Danlad Ibrahim in the club's bid to bolster their squad as they fought for survival in the second round of the 2020–21 Ghana Premier League.

References

External links 

 
 

Living people
1992 births
Association football defenders
Ghanaian footballers
Liberty Professionals F.C. players
Asante Kotoko S.C. players
Ashanti Gold SC players
King Faisal Babes FC players
Ghana Premier League players